Veil of Gossamer is a 2004 album by English rock musician Dave Bainbridge.

The idea for Veil of Gossamer came from an incident that is said to have occurred in the 7th century to a young shepherd boy whilst on the Northumbrian hills, tending his flock. Seeing a strange sight in the sky off in the distance near Bamburgh and Lindisfarne. It amounted to 'lights' ascending and descending from the heavens. The next day it appears this experience coincided with the death of the celtic saint, St. Aidan. The boy was Cuthbert who became a great church leader and saint himself and succeeded St. Aidan. the music comes from this inspiration.

Recordings took place at the following:
Open Sky Studio, Lincolnshire - (Engineer Dave Bainbridge)
also at
Studio Frank van Esses, Dalfsen, Holland - (for Frank's contributions)
Nick Beggs' studio, UK - (for Nick's basses)
Peter Whitfield's studio, UK - (for Peter's strings)
The Buddy Project, New York City, USA - (for Chris Hale's vocals)
various other places around Wales, Ireland, Scotland and England during 2003 and 2004



Personnel

Band
 Dave Bainbridge - Keyboards, Electric and Acoustic Guitars, Piano, Bouzouki, Mandolin, Balafon, 15 String Harp, Star Bells, Bongos, Hand Drum, Indian Tambourine, Shakers, Finger Cymbals
 Mae McKenna - Vocals (wordless, Gaelic)
 Rachel Jones - Vocals (wordless, whispered)
 Joanne Hogg - Vocals (wordless, ethereal, Spanish)
 Chris Hale - Improvised Vocals (wordless, Urdu)
 Troy Donockley - Uillean Pipes, Tin Whistles, Low Whistles, Vocals
 Tim Harries - Bass Guitar
 Frank van Essen - Drums, Percussion, Violin, Bodhran, Bells
 Peter Fairclough - Cymbal Sculptures, Gongs, Wind Chimes, Cymbals.
 Nick Beggs - Bass Guitar, Fretless Bass
 Peter Whitfield - Violins, Violas
 William Schofield - Solo Cello

Track listing
Disc - Total Time 64:19
Chanting Waves  – 2:17
Over The Waters  – 7:29
Veil Of Gossamer  – 4:55
Seen And Unseen  – 2:18
Everlasting Hills (part 1)  – 5:36
Everlasting Hills (part 2)  – 2:34
Everlasting Hills (part 3)  – 3:54
Everlasting Hills (part 4) ( – 02:54
Everlasting Hills (part 5)  – 4:36
Seahouses  – 3:06
Until The Tide Turns  – 4:29
Homeward Race  – 5:25
Star Filled Skies (part 1)  – 3:39
Star Filled Skies (part 2)  – 2:40
Star Filled Skies (part 3)  – 3:46
Star Filled Skies (part 4)  – 4:41

Release Details
2004, UK, Open Sky Records OPENVP4CD

Dave Bainbridge albums
2004 albums